Gracefield Island, also called The Phoenix, is a 100 hectares new city created via reclamation of land from the Lagos Lagoon. It is a joint venture between Gravitas Investments Limited (the city developers) and the Lagos State Government.

Overview 
Gracefield Island is a city developed from the reclamation of 100 hectares from the Lagos Lagoon and is expected to accommodate 10,000 – 25,000 people. The project, a joint venture between Lagos State Government and Gravitas Investments Limited, is located at the end of Chevron Drive, Lagos, and is connected to Lekki by its own highway.

The Lagos State Government approved the development of Gracefield Island in 2016.

Some notable companies with presence on the Gracefield Island are: Lafarge, Aspin, 9Mobile, Chevron Staff Coop, Zutari of South Africa, Samsson Group of Dubai, HealthCare Outpost.
The founder and Chief Executive of Gracefield Island is Mr. Olufemi Babalola and Chairman is Dr. Nu'uman Barau Danbatta, OFR, with Architect Ferdinand Agu, OFR, Peter Stephenson OBE, Leke Ojulari and Adetokunbo Adeyemo as directors.

Development Milestones 

In 2016, it was reported that Van_Oord, a marine engineering company working on land reclamation aspect of the project had reclaimed around 30 hectares of land at a finished height of 1.8 metres. By 2017, the city developers unveiled its nearly completed site office buildings.

Infrastructure 

It is planned to be a green city with integrated public charging points for electric vehicles, dedicated cycle lane and pedestrian pavements to encourage cycling and walking as standard means of movement.

Companies with presence on the Gracefield Island include Lafarge, 9Mobile, and HealthCare Outpost. 9Mobile is the exclusive provider of Fibre telecommunications service on the island.

References 

Artificial islands of Lagos
Land reclamation